J. Edward Meyer III (born April 15, 1935) is an American politician. Meyer, a Democrat, is a former member of the Connecticut State Senate, representing the 12th District from 2005 to 2015.  Meyer was also a member of the New York State Assembly, serving as a Republican from 1971 to 1973 and a Democrat from 1973 to 1975.

Early life and career

J. Edward Meyer III was born on April 15, 1935, in New York City, the son of J. Edward Meyer Jr. and Carolyn S. Meyer. He graduated from Yale University and Yale Law School.

In 1964, Meyer was appointed by then U.S. Attorney General Robert F. Kennedy to a position in the Justice Department, where he mainly focused on organized crime prosecutions. Meyer was a member of the New York State Assembly from 1971 to 1975, sitting in the 179th and 180th New York State Legislatures. While initially elected as a Republican, Meyer changed parties in 1973, serving out his term as a Democrat. In 1976, Meyer won the Democratic nomination for New York's 23rd congressional district, however, he was defeated in the general election by Bruce F. Caputo. Meyer also served on the Board of Regents of the State University of New York from 1977 to 2000.

Connecticut State Senator

Meyer, a resident of Guilford, represented the eastern suburbs of New Haven along the coast of Long Island Sound, including the towns of Branford, Durham, Guilford, Killingworth, Madison, and North Branford. As a state senator, he had been a leading supporter of legalizing assisted suicide.

Meyer's political career in Connecticut began in 2004 when he defeated seven term Republican incumbent William Aniskovich. Aniskovich was hampered by his alleged closeness to former Governor John G. Rowland, who had recently resigned due to a corruption investigation.

In 2006, Meyer defeated political newcomer Greg Hannan 23,600 to 13,127 to be elected to his second term in the Connecticut Senate. Meyer was elected to a third term in 2008 after defeating attorney and Iraq War veteran Ryan Suerth 30,565 to 20,430. In 2010, he defeated Durham Planning and Zoning Commissioner Lisa Davenport 21,311 to 19,567. In 2012, Meyer was re-elected to a fifth term, defeating Guilford Selectwoman Cindy Cartier 25,888 to 22,736.

In March 2014, Meyer announced that he would not be running for re-election.

See also

Connecticut Senate

References

External links
Official website
Campaign website

|-

1935 births
Living people
Politicians from New York City
Yale Law School alumni
New York (state) Republicans
New York (state) Democrats
Members of the New York State Assembly
People from Guilford, Connecticut
Connecticut state senators
Connecticut Democrats